Since You've Been Gone may refer to:

Music

Albums
 Since You've Been Gone (album), a 2001 album by Damage

Songs
 "Since You've Been Gone" (Day26 song), 2008
 "Since You've Been Gone" (The Outfield song), 1987
 "Since You've Been Gone" (Powderfinger song), 2004
 "(Sweet Sweet Baby) Since You've Been Gone", a 1968 song by Aretha Franklin
 "Since You've Been Gone", a song by Billy Fury from The Sound of Fury
 "Since You've Been Gone", a song by Bobby Darin (see also: Bobby Darin discography)
 "Since You've Been Gone", a song by Fine Young Cannibals from The Finest
 "Since You've Been Gone", a song by Impellitteri from Stand in Line
 "Since You've Been Gone", a song by The Four Tops from Four Tops Second Album
 "Since You've Been Gone", a song by GPS
 "Since You've Been Gone", a song by The Rasmus, B-side of the single "First Day of My Life"
 "Since You've Been Gone", a song by Theory of a Deadman from Gasoline
 "Since You've Been Gone", a song by Wayne Fontana and The Mindbenders, B-side of the single "Game of Love"
 "Since You've Been Gone", a song by "Weird Al" Yankovic from Bad Hair Day
 "Since You've Been Gone", a song by Tomas N'evergreen (Tomas Christiansen)

Other media
 Since You've Been Gone (film), a 1998 film directed by David Schwimmer
 "Since You've Been Gone", an episode of the television series Everwood
 Since You've Been Gone, a 2014 novel by Morgan Matson

See also
 "Since U Been Gone", a 2004 song by Kelly Clarkson
 "Since You Been Gone", a 1976 rock song by Russ Ballard, often incorrectly titled "Since You've Been Gone", also covered by Rainbow (1979)
 "Since You've Gone", a 1986 song by Belinda Carlisle
 "Since You're Gone", a 1982 song by The Cars